Marco Antonio Alvarez Ferreira, aka Cosa, or Cossa (born July 20, 1964) is a Brazilian goalie coach and former player. He attended the 2004 Summer Olympics.

Player career
He played for the following clubs: Santos (1979), Jabaquara (1981), Portuguesa Santista (1983–1985, 1994), Juventus-SP (1987), Nacional (1990), XV de Piracicaba (1991), São Bento (1995), Fortaleza (1996) and Confiança (1996).

Coaching career
He is a former Portuguesa Santista goalkeeper coach, and he has become the goalkeeper coach of South Korea national football team when Pim Verbeek was hired to be the head coach of the team. 
He has been coaching as goalkeeper coach in several countries such as Iran FC Persepolis, UAE Al Dhafra FC, Japan Shimizu S-Pulse, Thailand Buriram United F.C. and China Shijiazhuang Ever Bright F.C., under Afshin Ghotbi

References

External links
 Futebol Interior 
 Empas

1964 births
Living people
Brazilian footballers
Brazilian football managers
Santos FC players
Brazilian people of Spanish descent
Associação Desportiva Confiança players
Fortaleza Esporte Clube players
Clube Atlético Juventus players
Associação Atlética Portuguesa (Santos) players
Esporte Clube São Bento players
Esporte Clube XV de Novembro (Piracicaba) players
Persepolis F.C. non-playing staff
Association football goalkeepers